The Best of Special Ed is the greatest hits album by the rapper Special Ed, released in 2000.

Track listing
I Got It Made
Neva Go Back
Come On, Let's Move It
I'm the Magnificent (The Magnificent Remix)
Ready 2 Attack
The Mission
Freaky Flow
Think About It
I Got It Made (Businesslike Version)
Taxing

References

Special Ed albums
2000 greatest hits albums
Albums produced by Howie Tee